A dōjō is a hall or space for immersive learning or meditation (typically in martial arts, but increasingly in other fields, such as software development).

Dojo may also refer to:

Arts and entertainment

Music
 Dojo (instrument), a musical instrument
 Dōjō (band), musical duo of koto player Michiyo Yagi and drummer Tamaya Honda

Fictional entities
 Dojo (G.I. Joe), a fictional character in the G.I. Joe universe
 Dojo Kanojo Cho, a character in the television series Xiaolin Showdown
 Dojo Delivery, a courier service in the television series Get Ed

Science and technology
 Dojo loach, a freshwater fish
 Dojo Toolkit, a JavaScript library
 Tesla Dojo, a planned training supercomputer

Other uses
 Dojo, the temple name of Yi Chun, grandfather of King Taejo of Joseon

See also
 
 DoJa, Java application environment specification